The 2023 Manitoba Scotties Tournament of Hearts presented by RME, the provincial women's curling championship for Manitoba, was held from January 25 to 29 at East St. Paul Arena in East St. Paul, Manitoba. 

The winning Jennifer Jones represented Manitoba at the 2023 Scotties Tournament of Hearts, Canada's national women's curling championship in Kamloops, British Columbia where they finished runner-up overall losing in the final to Team Canada 10–4.

Additionally, two other rinks qualified for the Scotties as wild card teams based on CTRS standings. The Kaitlyn Lawes rink was the Wild Card #1 representative while the Abby Ackland rink (skipped by Meghan Walter) was the Wild Card #3 representative. The Lawes rink would finish tied for second (seeded fifth) in Pool A with a 5–3 record and would lose their tiebreaker game to Nova Scotia 7–6 in an extra end. The Ackland rink finished finished fifth in Pool B with a 3–5 record.

Qualification process
Source:

Teams
The teams are listed as follows:

Round-robin standings
Final round-robin standings

Round-robin results
All draws are listed in Central Time (UTC−06:00).

Draw 1
Wednesday, January 25, 8:30 am

Draw 2
Wednesday, January 25, 12:15 pm

Draw 3
Wednesday, January 25, 4:00 pm

Draw 4
Wednesday, January 25, 8:00 pm

Draw 5
Thursday, January 26, 8:30 am

Draw 6
Thursday, January 26, 12:15 pm

Draw 7
Thursday, January 26, 4:00 pm

Draw 8
Thursday, January 26, 7:45 pm

Draw 9
Friday, January 27, 9:00 am

Draw 10
Friday, January 27, 1:00 pm

Championship round standings
Records from Round Robin carry over to the Championship Round

Championship round results

Draw 11
Friday, January 27, 6:30 pm

Draw 12
Saturday, January 28, 10:00 am

Draw 13
Saturday, January 28, 4:00 pm

Tiebreaker
Saturday, January 28, 8:00 pm

Playoffs

Source:

Semifinal
Sunday, January 29, 9:30 am

Final
Sunday, January 29, 2:00 pm

Notes

References

2023 in Manitoba
Curling in Manitoba
2023 Scotties Tournament of Hearts
January 2023 sports events in Canada